Rukeyser is a surname. Notable people with the surname include:

Louis Rukeyser (1933-2006), American financial journalist
Merryle Rukeyser (1897–1988), was an American journalist and educator
Muriel Rukeyser (1913-1980), American poet and political activist
Stacy Rukeyser (born 1970), American television writer and producer
William S. Rukeyser (born 1939), American journalist